Elias Victor Seixas Jr. (pronounced SAY-shus; born August 30, 1923) is an American former tennis player.

Seixas was ranked in the top ten in the US on 13 occasions between 1942 and 1956. In 1951 Seixas was ranked No. 4 amateur in the world, two spots below Dick Savitt, while he was No. 1 in the U.S. ranking, one spot ahead of Savitt. In 1953, Seixas was ranked No. 3 in the world by Lance Tingay. In 1954 Seixas was ranked amateur number one by Harry Hopman.

In his career, Seixas won 15 Major championships.  He won both Wimbledon and the US Open in singles. He also won the Australian Open, French Open (twice), and US Open (twice) in doubles, and the French Open, Wimbledon (four times), and US Open (three times) in mixed doubles.

Seixas was inducted into the International Tennis Hall of Fame, the Blue Gray National Tennis Classic Hall of Fame, the Philadelphia Sports Hall of Fame, and the Southern Conference Hall of Fame.

Early life

Seixas was born in Philadelphia, Pennsylvania to Anna Victoria (Moon), who was of Irish descent, and Elias Victor Seixas Sr., who was born in the Dominican Republic, of Portuguese-Sephardi Jewish descent. He is reported to be Jewish by a number of sources, but was raised Presbyterian. He attended and graduated from the William Penn Charter School, where he was a tennis star.

He served as a pilot in the United States Army Air Corps in World War II for three years, which interrupted his tennis career.

He then attended the University of North Carolina at Chapel Hill, where he was a member of Alpha Sigma of the Chi Psi fraternity. He was 63–3 at UNC, won the Southern Conference singles championship in 1948 and the doubles championship in 1949, and was an All American. He graduated in 1949, the same year that UNC awarded him the Patterson Medal, the school's top medal in athletics.

Tennis career
During the course of his lengthy career, Seixas won scores of singles, doubles, and mixed doubles titles. He entered the US Championships men's singles a record 28 times between 1940 and 1969.

Seixas was ranked in the top ten in the US 13 times from 1942 to 1956. In 1951 Seixas was ranked No. 4 in the world, two spots below Dick Savitt, while he was No. 1 in the US ranking (a ranking he also held in 1954 and 1957), one spot ahead of Savitt. In 1953, Seixas was ranked No. 3 in the world by Lance Tingay and was cited as being the World No. 1 in the Reading Eagle the same year.

His major singles wins include Wimbledon in 1953 over Kurt Nielsen (where his 'cash' winnings was a £25 certificate to spend at a shop in Piccadilly Circus) and the US National (U.S. Open) in 1954 over Rex Hartwig.

Seixas was also a successful doubles and mixed doubles player. In 1952, he won the US National doubles with Mervyn Rose. In the mid-1950s, he formed a successful partnership with Tony Trabert, winning the 1954 French and  US Championships, as well as the 1955 Australian and French Championships. Additionally, they won the decisive third point in the 1954 Davis Cup win over Australia. Seixas won four consecutive mixed doubles crowns at Wimbledon from 1953 to 1956, the first three with Doris Hart and the fourth with Shirley Fry; the US National mixed doubles from 1953 to 1955, all with Doris Hart; and the French Championships mixed doubles in 1953 with Doris Hart.

In 1966, at 42 years of age, Seixas played 94 games over four hours to defeat 22-year old Australian Bill Bowrey, 32–34, 6–4, 10–8 at the 1966 Philadelphia Grass Championship.

The same year, Seixas was rated as the Senior Squash Champion of America.

Davis Cup
Seixas and Trabert won the Davis Cup in 1954, against Australia. Seixas is rated fifth in the category of most Davis Cup Singles matches (24), just behind Bill Tilden (25) and Arthur Ashe (27). He served three times as Captain of the US Davis Cup team. He was 38–17 lifetime in Davis Cup matches.

Halls of Fame
Seixas was inducted into the International Tennis Hall of Fame in 1971. He was also inducted into the Blue Gray National Tennis Classic Hall of Fame.

Seixas was inducted into Class II of the Philadelphia Sports Hall of Fame in 2005. He was inducted into the Southern Conference Hall of Fame in 2011.

After tennis retirement
Seixas was a stockbroker from the late 1950s until the early 1970s. Afterward, he worked as a tennis director for the Greenbrier Resort in White Sulphur Springs, West Virginia and at a Hilton Hotel in New Orleans.

He moved to California in 1989, where he lived in Mill Valley and established a tennis program at the Harbor Point Racquet and Beach Club in Mill Valley (Marin County), now known as The Club at Harbor Point. In 1998, unable to play tennis any longer due to his knees, he chose to become a bartender at Harbor Point. After several years bartending and helping with the club's front desk duties, he retired.

Seixas is currently the oldest living Grand Slam singles champion in the world, and the oldest living member of the Tennis Hall of Fame.

Grand Slam finals

Singles: 5 (2 titles, 3 runners-up)

Doubles: 8 (5 titles, 3 runners-up)

Mixed doubles: 8 (8 titles)

Grand Slam performance timeline

See also
List of select Jewish tennis players

References

External links
 
 
 
 
 Prominent members of Chi Psi

1923 births
Living people
American people of Portuguese-Jewish descent
American sportspeople of Dominican Republic descent
American male tennis players
American people of Dominican Republic descent
Australian Championships (tennis) champions
French Championships (tennis) champions
Jewish American sportspeople
Jewish tennis players
American Sephardic Jews
American Presbyterians
North Carolina Tar Heels men's basketball players
International Tennis Hall of Fame inductees
Tennis players from Philadelphia
United States Army Air Forces officers
United States Army Air Forces pilots of World War II
United States National champions (tennis)
Wimbledon champions (pre-Open Era)
Grand Slam (tennis) champions in men's singles
Grand Slam (tennis) champions in mixed doubles
Grand Slam (tennis) champions in men's doubles
William Penn Charter School alumni
American men's basketball players
American people of Irish descent
21st-century American Jews
The Greenbrier people
North Carolina Tar Heels men's tennis players
World number 1 ranked male tennis players
American people of Portuguese descent
Brazilian American
American people of Brazilian descent